The Arrow Active is a British aerobatic aircraft built in the 1930s.

Design and development
The Arrow Active is a single-seat biplane of conventional configuration, with single-bay, staggered wings of unequal span and chord, bordering on being a sesquiplane. The upper and lower wings are joined by a single interplane strut.  The undercarriage is fixed, with a pair of mainwheels and a tail-skid. It was originally powered by a 115 hp (86 kW) Cirrus-Hermes IIB engine.

The second aircraft built featured a more powerful 120 hp (90 kW) de Havilland Gipsy III and was designated Active 2.  It also differed from the Active 1 in having a strutted, conventional centre section, a slightly different shaped fin and rudder, and smaller, wider wheels.

Operational history
Although it was originally hoped that the military might show an interest in the aircraft, this did not transpire, and the Active was flown as a sports plane. 
The Active 1 G-ABIX received its Certificate of Airworthiness on 21 May 1931 and flew at 132.2 mph (212 km/h) in the 1932 King's Cup Race.  It was Alex Henshaw's mount in the second half of 1935 until severely damaged in a crash following an in-flight fire that December.

The Active 2 G-ABVE was certified on 29 June 1932 and flew in the King's Cup in both 1932 and 1933. Slightly faster than the Arrow 1, it recorded a speed of 137 mph (220 km/h)

Variants
Active 1
One aircraft powered by a 115hp (86kW) Cirrus Hermes IIB engine.
Active 2
One aircraft powered by a 120hp (90kW) de Havilland Gipsy III engine, rebuilt in 1958 with a de Havilland Gipsy Major 1C.

Surviving aircraft
Rebuilt in 1958, and again in 1989, the Active 2 is still on the British civil register and is based at Coventry, England.

Specifications (Active 2)

References

Notes

Bibliography

 

 
 
 

1930s British sport aircraft
Active
Biplanes
Single-engined tractor aircraft
Aerobatic aircraft
Aircraft first flown in 1931